This article details the fixtures and results of the Thailand national football team in 2015.
 Only record the results that affect the FIFA/Coca-Cola World Ranking. See FIFA 'A' matches criteria.

Record

Goalscorers

vs Singapore
International friendly

Assistant referees:
Palitha Hemathunga (Sri Lanka)
Nguyen Vu Hai Phi (Vietnam)
Fourth official:
Nguyễn Hiền Triết (Vietnam)

vs Cameroon
International friendly

Assistant referees:
Palitha Hemathunga (Sri Lanka)
Nguyen Vu Hai Phi (Vietnam)
Fourth official:
Nguyễn Hiền Triết (Vietnam)

vs North Korea
International friendly

Assistant referees:
Sumate Saiwaew (Thailand)
Suprem Nonthawong (Thailand)
Fourth official:
Ponkit Nitayachat(Thailand)

vs Vietnam(1)
2018 FIFA World Cup qualification – AFC second round

Assistant referees:
Matthew Cream (Australia)
Paul Cetrangolo (Australia)
Fourth official:
Tayeb Shamsuzzaman(Bangladesh)

vs Bahrain
International friendly

Assistant referees:
Nguyen Trung Hau (Vietnam)
Nguyen Vu Hai Phi (Vietnam)
Fourth official:
Alongkorn Feemuechang (Thailand)

vs Chinese Taipei(1)
2018 FIFA World Cup qualification – AFC second round

Assistant referees:
Humoud Rhsr Alsahli (Kuwait)
Ali Mesh Behzad (Kuwait)
Fourth official:
Jassim Mjmj Ahmad (Kuwait)

vs Afghanistan
International friendly

Assistant referees:
Nguyen Vu Hai Phi (Vietnam)
Anuwat Feemuechang (Thailand)
Fourth official:
Sivakorn Pu-Udom  (Thailand)

vs Iraq
2018 FIFA World Cup qualification – AFC second round

Assistant referees:
Otsuka Haruhiro(Japan)
Igarashi Hiroyuki (Japan)
Fourth official:
Hidayat Ullah  (Pakistan)

vs Hong Kong
International friendly

Assistant referees:
Pham Manh Long (Vietnam)
Kriangsak Keattisongkram (Thailand)
Fourth official:
Teetichai Nualjan  (Thailand)

vs Vietnam(2)
2018 FIFA World Cup qualification – AFC second round

Assistant referees:
 Ibrahim Saleh (Bahrain)
 Nawaf Shaheen Moosa (Bahrain)
Fourth official:
Abdulaziz Yusuf Abdulaziz (Bahrain)

vs Chinese Taipei(2)
2018 FIFA World Cup qualification – AFC second round

Assistant referees:
bakhadyr kochkarov (Kyrgyzstan)
Ismailzhan Talipzhanov (Kyrgyzstan)
Fourth official:
Rysbek Shekerbekov (Kyrgyzstan)

References

Links
Fixtures and Results on FIFA.com
Thailand Matches on Elo Ratings

2015 in Thai football
2015 national football team results
Thailand national football team results